"Let Love Come Between Us" is a song written by Joe Sobotka and Johnny Wyker and performed by James & Bobby Purify.   The song was featured on their 1968 album, The Pure Sound of The Purifys - James & Bobby.  The song was produced by Papa Don Enterprises.

Chart performance
"Let Love Come Between Us" reached #18 on the US R&B chart, #23 on the Billboard Hot 100, and #51 on the UK Singles Chart in 1967.

Other versions
The Rubber Band, featuring the one of the song's writers, Wyker, released the original version of the song as a single in 1966.
Mark Williams covered the song on his 1975 album, Mark Williams.
Peters and Lee released a version of the song as a single in 1977.
Mavis Staples released a version of the song on her 1979 album, Oh What A Feeling.
Delbert McClinton released a version of the song as a single in 1981.

References

1966 songs
1966 singles
1967 singles
1977 singles
1981 singles
James & Bobby Purify songs
Delbert McClinton songs
Bell Records singles
Philips Records singles
MCA Records singles